WDSC-TV (channel 24) is an independent non-commercial educational television station licensed to New Smyrna Beach, Florida, United States. Owned by Daytona State College, the station maintains studios at the Center for Educational Telecommunications on the DSC campus in Daytona Beach, and its transmitter is located near Bithlo, Florida.

History
In 1985, DSC (then known as Daytona Beach Community College), Bethune–Cookman College, Stetson University, Embry-Riddle Aeronautical University and the Atlantic Center for the Arts formed the Coastal Educational Broadcasters consortium in order to bring a public television station to Volusia and Flagler counties. They felt WMFE-TV, the PBS station in Orlando, was neglecting Daytona Beach. Channel 15 signed on February 8, 1988, as WCEU with a limited schedule of three hours a day, three days a week. Support in the area was enough that within nine months, it was recognized by the Corporation for Public Broadcasting. By January 1989, it was a full-fledged PBS member station, though it didn't expand to a fuller broadcast day until 1993.

In 1992, a signal expansion and must-carry rules expanded WCEU's audience to over 1.3 million viewers in Central Florida, including Orlando itself. It moved to its current facility in 1999. DBCC became the sole licensee in 2002.

In 2005, WCEU rebranded itself as DBCC 15 to better reflect its relationship with DBCC. In January 2008, it rebranded itself again merely as Channel 15, after DBCC became Daytona Beach College. The college subsequently changed its name again to Daytona State College; to reflect this, in November 2008, channel 15 changed its call letters to the current WDSC-TV, after purchasing the rights to the call letters from a radio station in Dillon, South Carolina.

With the advent of digital broadcasting, WDSC-TV began billing itself as a full-market PBS station, including Orlando. While it had been available on cable in Orlando for over a decade, its digital signal, located in Bithlo with most other television stations in the market, gives it an over-the-air coverage area comparable to the market's previous primary PBS station WMFE-TV. However, on June 16, 2011, WDSC and PBS announced that the station would leave PBS, as Daytona State College could no longer afford to purchase its programming, following $4.8 million of funding to Florida's public radio and television stations vetoed by Governor Rick Scott in May 2011. PBS programming disappeared from channel 15 on July 1, 2011; WMFE also left PBS on the same date due to its then-planned sale to Daystar. These moves left WBCC of Cocoa, which began branding as WUCF-TV at that time, as the only PBS station in the Central Florida television market. (WUCF-TV moved to the former WMFE-TV in 2012, a move that led to WBCC, now WEFS, departing PBS as well.)

Technical information

Subchannels
The station's digital signal is multiplexed:

Analog-to-digital conversion
WDSC-TV shut down its analog signal, over UHF channel 15, which due to major equipment failure had been operating at significantly reduced power since September 25, 2008, on December 15 of that year. The station's digital signal continued to broadcast on its pre-transition UHF channel 33. Through the use of PSIP, digital television receivers display the station's virtual channel as its former UHF analog channel 15.

The station continues to air public television from other sources such as American Public Television and the National Educational Telecommunications Association.

References

External links 

Television channels and stations established in 1988
Volusia County, Florida
Daytona State College
DSC-TV
1988 establishments in Florida
New Smyrna Beach, Florida